Wilbur Strozier (born November 12, 1964) is a former American football tight end. He played for the Seattle Seahawks in 1987 and for the San Diego Chargers in 1988.

References

1964 births
Living people
American football tight ends
Georgia Bulldogs football players
Seattle Seahawks players
San Diego Chargers players
People from LaGrange, Georgia
Players of American football from Georgia (U.S. state)